Live! at Caesar's Palace is the debut album by Checkmates, Ltd., released in 1967.  It reached No. 36 on the U.S. R&B chart.

Track listing
Songs 1-7 are part of a medley:
 "What'd I Say" (Ray Charles)
 "Can I Get a Witness" (Brian Holland/Lamont Dozier/Eddie Holland)
 "Bread and Butter" (Larry Parks, Jay Turnbow)
 "Little Bitty Pretty One" (Bobby Day)
 "Rockin' Robin" (Jimmie Thomas)
 "Everybody Loves a Lover" (Robert Allen/Richard Adler)
 "Mr. Lee" (The Bobbettes) – 5:45
 "Sunny" (Bobby Hebb) – 4:44
 "A Quitter Never Wins" (Willie Hooks) – 3:43
 "You've Lost That Lovin' Feelin'" (Phil Spector/Barry Mann/Cynthia Weil) – 6:06
 "Show Me" (Joe Tex) – 3:49
 "Ebb Tide" (Robert Maxwell/Carl Sigman) – 5:00
 "Hold On, I'm Comin'" (Isaac Hayes/David Porter) – 5:00
 "Baby, I Need Your Lovin'" (Holland/Dozier/Holland) – 10:28

Personnel
Kelly Gordon – producer

Charts

References

1967 live albums
1967 debut albums
Checkmates, Ltd. albums
Capitol Records live albums
Albums recorded at Caesars Palace